Paycheck is a 2003 American science fiction film directed by John Woo. Written by Dean Georgaris, it is based on the 1953 short story "Paycheck" by Philip K. Dick. The film stars Ben Affleck, Uma Thurman, Aaron Eckhart, Paul Giamatti, Michael C. Hall, Joe Morton, and Colm Feore. The film was released on December 25, 2003, by Paramount Pictures in North America and DreamWorks Pictures internationally, to negative reviews but was a commercial success, grossing $117.2 million on a $60 million budget.

Plot
In the near future, Michael Jennings is a reverse engineer; he analyzes his clients' competitors' technology and recreates it with improvements. To protect his clients' intellectual property and himself, Jennings undergoes memory wipes to remove knowledge of his engineering with aid of his friend Shorty.

Jennings is contacted by his college roommate James Rethrick, the CEO of technology company Allcom. Rethrick offers Jennings a lengthy three-year job, during which he will be required to stay on Allcom's campus, in exchange for company stock. Jennings is hesitant but agrees. After being injected with the memory marker, Jennings is given a tour of the campus, where he meets and flirts with biologist Dr. Rachel Porter. Rethrick then introduces Jennings to his work partner, physicist William Dekker.

Three years later, Jennings wakes from the memory wipe and is congratulated by Rethrick. Further, he is given an envelope claiming to be his possessions on entering Allcom, but it contains a random assortment of items. Confused, Jennings soon finds himself detained by the FBI. Agent Dodge accuses Jennings of having access to classified government designs that had been taken by Dekker, who is now dead. Jennings cannot answer due to the memory wipe, but finds a means to escape using the items in the envelope. As he evades the FBI, Rethrick's right-hand-man John Wolfe sees Jennings walking away and warns Rethrick they have a problem.

Jennings meets with Shorty to try to figure out what happened, but then sees a lottery number result on a television, the numbers matching those on a fortune cookie message in the envelope. He realizes that he must have built a machine at Allcom to see into the future, planting items in that envelope to help fix things. At Allcom, Rethrick tries to use Jennings' machine, but instead finds that it was jury-rigged to go offline after Jennings had left. Rethrick studies Jennings' habits while at Allcom and discovers that he got romantically involved with Porter and left a secret message to meet her at a cafe later that day. Rethrick sends a body double to try to coerce Jennings to turn over the envelope, but the real Porter shows up and rescues Jennings. The two elude the FBI and Rethrick's men. While hiding, they find that the stamps on the envelopes contain microdot images taken from the device, showing newspaper headlines from the future that while Allcom became incredibly successful with the device, it led to international political strife and the United States launching a pre-emptive nuclear strike. They agree that the machine must be destroyed.

Using the last items in the envelope, Jennings and Porter gain access to Allcom and the machine, while separately the FBI have started to investigate Allcom. Jennings discovers the circuit he rigged and fixes it, while booby-trapping the machine to be destroyed in a few minutes. He uses the machine one last time to see himself being shot at by an FBI agent in the catwalks about the machine. Rethrick, Wolfe, and other men arrive, and Jennings and Porter escape to the catwalks. Wolfe tries to use the machine to help track Jennings, while Rethrick corners the pair on the catwalk. FBI agents storm the lab, and one appears on the catwalk, the same tableau that Jennings had seen. As the FBI fires, a watch from the envelope beeps, and Jennings dodges in time for the bullet to fatally hit Rethrick. Wolfe is killed as Jennings' booby-trap goes off and destroys the machine. After the chaos dies down and the FBI begin a full investigation, Agent Dodge finds the watch Jennings had used, but consequently hides it and declares him dead.

Elsewhere, Jennings, Porter, and Shorty have moved to the countryside. Shorty was able to use his influence to rescue the cage of a pair of lovebirds Porter had been raising at Allcom.

Cast
 Ben Affleck as Michael Jennings, a reverse engineer
 Uma Thurman as Rachel Porter, a biologist and Jennings's lover
 Aaron Eckhart as James Rethrick, a billionaire CEO and Jennings' former friend
 Colm Feore as John Wolfe, Rethrick's right-hand man
 Peter Friedman as Attorney General Brown
 Paul Giamatti as Shorty, Jennings's friend
 Michael C. Hall as Agent Klein
 Ivana Milicevic as Maya-Rachel, the double for Rachel
 Kathryn Morris as Rita Dune
 Joe Morton as Agent Dodge
 Serge Houde as William Dekker
 Callum Keith Rennie as Jude - Guard

Additionally, Krista Allen appears as The Projection in a 3D computer Michael developed.

Production
The film began development in 1996 when the short story was optioned by Caravan Pictures. Prior to John Woo being selected to direct, Brett Ratner was in talks to direct. Matt Damon was offered the role of Michael Jennings, but declined.

The film features several of director Woo's trademarks, including two Mexican standoffs, the appearance of a dove and a birdcage similar to the one seen in 1992's Hard Boiled.

Reception

Critical response

Rotten Tomatoes gives Paycheck an approval of 27% based on 157 reviews, with an average rating of 4.7/10. The site's critics consensus states, "Though Dick's short story has an intriguing premise, Woo reduces it to a lot of meaningless chases, shoot-outs, and explosions." On Metacritic it has a weighted average score of 43 out of 100 based on 34 critics, indicating "mixed or average reviews". Audiences surveyed by CinemaScore gave the film a grade B− on an A+ to F scale.

Scott Tobias of The A.V. Club gave the film a positive review, calling it a "smart thriller" and praising "Woo's wonderful sense of timing and rhythm." Chris Barsanti of Film Threat also praised Paycheck, calling it "one of the more competent and reassuring action movies to come out for quite some time."

Roger Ebert gave the film two stars (out of four), saying that he "enjoyed the movie" but felt that it "exploits [Philip K. Dick's story] for its action and plot potential, but never really develops it."  K. J. Doughton of Film Threat called the film "John Woo lite," and a "neutered variation on his earlier, superior works." James Berardinelli gave the film one and a half stars out of four, calling it "a bad film, complete with lackluster acting, brainless writing, and uninspired direction."

About the movie's reception, John Woo said: "I was fine with the sci-fi in Paycheck because there wasn't too much. I had intended to make an Alfred Hitchcock-style movie out of it, something more about suspense and thrills than guns and shooting, but unfortunately the script wasn't written that way. It didn't work well for the suspense, and it didn't come out the way I wanted it to be, not as Hitchcockian. But at least it was nice working with Ben Affleck."

Awards

Ben Affleck won a Golden Raspberry Award for Worst Actor for his performance in Paycheck and two others: Gigli and Daredevil. After asking why he did not get his trophy, he was presented the Razzie live on Larry King Live a week later, and promptly broke it. The broken trophy was sold on eBay for enough money to cover the hall rental for the following year's ceremonies. While hosting Saturday Night Live, Ben Affleck joked that he would have walked out of the premiere and asked for his money back until he realized he was in the movie.

References

External links
 
 
 
 
 

2003 films
2003 science fiction action films
American science fiction action films
Films about the Federal Bureau of Investigation
Films about altered memories
Films based on short fiction
Films based on works by Philip K. Dick
Films set in 2007
Films set in Seattle
Films shot in Vancouver
Holography in films
Films directed by John Woo
Films produced by John Davis
Films scored by John Powell
Paramount Pictures films
Golden Raspberry Award winning films
DreamWorks Pictures films
Davis Entertainment films
Time loop films
Films about time travel
Techno-thriller films
Films about amnesia
2000s English-language films
2000s American films